The 1915 American Cup was the annual open cup held by the American Football Association. The Scottish-Americans, after two previous final appearances, won their first American Cup by overcoming the Brooklyn Celtics 1-0 in the championship game.

American Cup Bracket

(*) protested

Final

Lineups:Scots- GK Joe Knowles, DF Mike Toman(c), Barry, MF Tom Stark, George P Rogers Sr, Alex Montieth, FW Joe Hemmesley, Archie Stark, Angus Whiston, Eddie Holt, Bunt Forlar.Celts- GK Mather, DF Robertson, McWilliams, MF Flanigan, McElroy, McGreevey, FW Campton, Lonie, O'Halloran, Mike King, McQueen.

See also
1915 National Challenge Cup

References

Amer
American Cup